Heathrow Express is a high-frequency airport rail link operating between London Heathrow Airport and . Opened in 1998, trains run non-stop, with a journey time of 15 minutes. The service is operated jointly by Great Western Railway and Heathrow Express Operating Company, a wholly owned subsidiary of Heathrow Airport Holdings.

History
Heathrow Express was planned as a joint venture between the British Airports Authority (BAA) and British Rail, but was taken over fully by the former following the privatisation of British Rail. Construction began in 1993. Electrification of the Great Western Main Line (GWML) between Paddington and Airport Junction, where the new line diverged from the GWML, was also required. A flying junction known as 'Stockley Flyover' was constructed to connect the tunnel to the GWML fast lines. During construction, a notable tunnel collapse occurred including the subsidence of a surface building, leading to a six-month delay in opening and additional costs of around £150million.

Beginning in January 1998, an interim service called Heathrow FastTrain ran to a temporary station called Heathrow Junction, where a coach took passengers the rest of the way. Full service to Heathrow Central and Terminal 4 opened on 23 June 1998, with an opening by Prime Minister Tony Blair.

From 1999 to 2003, a check-in service was provided at Paddington, allowing Heathrow Express passengers to check in and drop off their luggage prior to flights, which was similar to the service currently provided on Hong Kong's Airport Express. Checked baggage was transported to the airport by using the luggage space at the westbound first carriage. This service was withdrawn due to low usage and high cost of operation.

In June 2005, Heathrow Express began jointly providing a new Heathrow Connect service, which saw a new twice-hourly stopping service on the same route between Paddington and Heathrow using  EMUs from the Siemens Desiro family. Heathrow Airport Holdings had provided the on-board staff through Heathrow Express as part of the contract. This continued until May 2018, which saw Heathrow Connect absorbed into TfL Rail ahead of the new Crossrail project. In May 2022, TfL Rail services were rebranded as the Elizabeth line, with through trains running through central London from November 2022. Heathrow Express services will continue to terminate at London Paddington.

In August 2018, Great Western Railway (GWR) took over the operation of Heathrow Express as part of a new management contract. Heathrow Airport continues to be responsible for commercial aspects of the service, including marketing, ticket pricing and revenue management, while GWR are now responsible for operations.

Service

Trains depart Paddington every 15minutes from 05:10 (06:10 on Sunday) until 23:25, and there is a similar quarter-hourly service in the return direction. At Paddington they use dedicated platforms 6 and 7, although on occasions other platforms are used. There are two stops at Heathrow: Heathrow Central, serving Terminals 2 and 3 (journey time from Paddington 15minutes); and Heathrow Terminal 5 (journey time 21minutes), platforms 3 and 4. Until the opening of Terminal 5 on 27 March 2008, Heathrow Express terminated at Heathrow Terminal 4. In 2010, Heathrow Express introduced a dedicated shuttle between Heathrow Central and Terminal 4 that would be timed to connect with the main Heathrow Express service to/from Terminal 5 to improve connections between the terminals.

Heathrow Express has been generally well received, not least because steps were taken to reduce the environmental impact, including disguising ventilation shafts as barns.

On board

Trains offer a choice of two classes of travel, express class which corresponds to standard class, and "business first" class which corresponds to first class. Both classes have large luggage storage spaces and complimentary WiFi. First class offers wider seats and a table at every seat.

Children under 16 travel free of charge with a fare-paying adult; unaccompanied children may travel free of charge in express class only with proof of a same-day flight to or from Heathrow.

Route
The service runs along Network Rail's Great Western Main Line from Paddington to Airport Junction. The line from Airport Junction to the airport terminals is owned by Heathrow Airport Holdings but maintained by Network Rail. The line is electrified at  overhead and uses Automatic Train Protection (ATP) and European Train Control System (ETCS).  The controlling signal centre for the entire route is the Thames Valley Signalling Centre (TVSC) in Didcot.

Stations

Rolling stock

Current fleet
From 29 December 2020, the first of twelve Class 387 units from the Bombardier Electrostar family began service with Heathrow Express, having replaced the Class 332 fleet. The units transferred from Great Western Railway who are also responsible for their maintenance and operation within Heathrow Express. The units underwent modifications prior to their introduction on Heathrow Express which included the fitting of USB power sockets, extra luggage space, work tables, on-board WiFi and HD TVs. A new Business First cabin was also included in a 2+1 configuration with reclining seats.

Past fleet

Until May 2018, Heathrow Express leased a singular Class 360 unit which operated the shuttle service between Heathrow Central and Heathrow Terminal 4. After the withdrawal of the Class 360 unit, all Heathrow Express services were operated by Class 332 units built by CAF with traction equipment supplied by Siemens Transportation Systems. In 2019, it was announced that all the Class 332 units would be replaced by a fleet of twelve Class 387 units from Great Western Railway with GWR also managing their introduction and arrival. The first Class 332 unit was withdrawn and scrapped in November 2020 and by 28 December 2020, all of the units were withdrawn.

See also
 Gatwick Express - a similar express service between London Victoria station and Gatwick Airport
 Stansted Express - a similar express service between London Liverpool Street station and London Stansted Airport

References

Further reading

External links 

Airport rail links in London
Express Heathrow Express
Open-access train operating companies
Railway companies established in 1998
Railway operators in London
Railway services introduced in 1998
1998 establishments in England
British companies established in 1998